Anthony Dewayne Marshall (born September 16, 1970) is a former professional American football safety in the National Football League. He played five seasons for the Chicago Bears, the New York Jets, and the Philadelphia Eagles.  After winding down his career in the NFL, Marshall finished his football career by playing for the Memphis Maniax of the XFL.  "AM" as was his nickname in his playing days, claims Bill Parcells was one of his best coaches, and claims he would follow that man anywhere.

External links
Just Sports Stats

1970 births
Living people
Sportspeople from Mobile, Alabama
Players of American football from Alabama
American football cornerbacks
LSU Tigers football players
Chicago Bears players
New York Jets players
Philadelphia Eagles players
Memphis Maniax players